In Spanish football, the Guruceta trophy is awarded by Spanish sports newspaper MARCA to the best referee for each season. It is named in honour of the famous Spanish referee, Emilio Guruceta.

Rules
After every match the MARCA journalist covering the match will evaluate the referees performance with a score out of 3 - 3 being the best and 0 the worst. At the end of the season a coefficient will be calculated between the number of matches refereed and the number of points awarded. The referee with the highest coefficient wins the trophy.

Winners

La Liga

Segunda División

External links
MARCA website

La Liga trophies and awards
Segunda División trophies and awards
Spanish football trophies and awards